Browntown is an unincorporated community and census-designated place (CDP) in Lee County, South Carolina, United States. It was first listed as a CDP prior to the 2020 census. The population as of 2020 was 206.

Interstate 20 forms the southern edge of the CDP, with the closest access being from Exit 116 (U.S. Route 15),  to the east. The southwest edge of the CDP is Scape Ore Swamp, a southeast-flowing tributary of the Black River and part of the Winyah Bay watershed.

Demographics

2020 census

Note: the US Census treats Hispanic/Latino as an ethnic category. This table excludes Latinos from the racial categories and assigns them to a separate category. Hispanics/Latinos can be of any race.

References 

Census-designated places in Lee County, South Carolina
Census-designated places in South Carolina